Ephysteris curtipennis is a moth in the family Gelechiidae. It was described by Zerny in 1935. It is found in Morocco.

References

Ephysteris
Moths described in 1935